The 2022 EuroCup Final was the final match of the 2021–22 EuroCup Basketball, the 20th season of Euroleague Basketball's secondary level professional club basketball tournament, and the 14th season since it was renamed from the ULEB Cup to the EuroCup. It was played at the Virtus Segafredo Arena in Bologna, Italy, on 11 May 2022, between Italian club Virtus Segafredo Bologna and Turkish club Frutti Extra Bursaspor.

Virtus Segafredo Bologna defeated Frutti Extra Bursaspor 80–67 to conquer their 1st EuroCup title and earned the right to play in the 2022–23 EuroLeague. Virtus Segafredo Bologna also became the first Italian team to win the EuroCup.

Background 
It was the first ever EuroCup final appearance ever of Virtus Segafredo Bologna and Frutti Extra Bursaspor, after Virtus Segafredo Bologna never reached a stage further than the semifinals in history and Frutti Extra Bursaspor never reached a stage further than the regular season in history. Virtus Segafredo Bologna also became the first Italian team to reach an EuroCup final.

Virtus Segafredo Bologna played in their 11th European final. They previously won the Saporta Cup title in 1990, lifted the EuroLeague trophy twice in 1998 and 2001, claimed the EuroChallenge crown in 2009 and the Champions League in 2019. Virtus Segafredo Bologna also played three EuroLeague finals (1981, 1999 and 2002), and two Saporta Cup championship games (1978 and 2000).

Venue 
The arena was inaugurated on 10 November 2019, for the home game against Treviso Basket, won by Virtus 84–79. On 25 December, for the derby against Fortitudo Bologna, 9,166 fans attended the game, achieving a new record for Virtus in LBA. In January 2020, the arena was dismantled and rebuilt in September, to host the Final Four of the 2020 Italian Basketball Supercup. Moreover, the arena became the official home court of Virtus for the 2020–21 season of LBA and EuroCup.

In April 2021, Massimo Zanetti, owner of Virtus and Segafredo, announced that the team will remain to the Segafredo Arena for at least three more seasons, with the hope of starting to build a new arena in 2022. On 11 June 2021, at the Segafredo Arena, Virtus defeated its historic rival Olimpia Milano in the national finals, winning its 16th national title and the first one after twenty years. In November 2021, the arena was moved to another fair pavilion with a capacity of 10,000 seats and was inaugurated on 17 November for a EuroCup match against Reyer Venezia.

Road to the Final 

Note: In the table, the score of the finalist is given first (H = home; A = away).

Match details

See also 
 2022 EuroLeague Final Four
 2022 Basketball Champions League Final Four
 2022 FIBA Europe Cup Finals

References

External links 
 Official website

Final
2022
2021–22 in Italian basketball
2022
International basketball competitions hosted by Italy